George Michael Mukula, commonly known as Mike Mukula, is a Ugandan politician, professional pilot, and businessman. He represented Soroti Municipality from 1996 to 2016 in the parliament of Uganda. He is a member of the ruling National Resistance Movement and served as state minister of health from 2001 to 2006. He is the current Vice Chairman (Eastern Region) for the ruling National Resistance Movement  in Uganda

Early life and education
Mukula was born in Soroti, Teso sub-region in the Eastern Region of Uganda on 27 August 1956. He attended local schools before he was admitted to the Kenya School of Flying at Wilson Airport in Nairobi, Kenya. He completed his pilot's training in the United States. In 2005, he was awarded a Master of Business Administration by Nkumba University. In 2009, he was awarded an honorary doctorate degree by the Latin University of Theology, based in Torrance, California, USA.

Career
In the late 1980s, Mukula worked as a personal pilot for President Yoweri Museveni. Mukula owned a fleet of Cessna aircraft that he leased out. He personally piloted the president in one of those planes. He entered politics in 2001, when he successfully contested for the Soroti Municipality parliamentary seat. He has continuously occupied that seat since, successfully defending it in 2006 and in 2011. In 2001, he was appointed state minister for health, serving in that position until 2006. In the cabinet reshuffle of 23 May 2006, Museveni removed him from his cabinet.

In May 2015, Mukula announced that he would leave elective politics effective March 2016.

Controversy

On 5 April 2007, the Inspectorate of Government (IGG) wrote a report to the President of Uganda following their investigations into the alleged mismanagement and abuse of the Global Alliance for Vaccines and Immunization (GAVI) funds.

On the basis of the report, the Inspectorate of Government recommended prosecution, restitution, and possible imprisonment if found guilty. The IGG went ahead and prosecuted George Michael Mukula together with the Minister of Health Muhwezi, the Minister of State for Health Dr Kamugisha and Alice Kaboyo for alleged theft  of  Shs 210,000,000/= (approximately USD$56,800).

On January 31, 2005, the Office of the First Lady of Uganda wrote to George Michael Mukula (then Minister of State for Health), requesting him to source for funds that would facilitate the First Lady’s advocacy programs covering areas such as nutrition, safe motherhood, malaria, immunization and HIV/AIDS at village level.  Mukula then wrote to Jim Muhwezi (the Minister of Health) submitting the First Lady’s request for appropriate action. Jim Muhwezi then instructed the Ministry of Health’s Permanent Secretary to release Shs 263,855,000/= (approximately USD$71,312), from the GAVI funds and that accountability would be provided later on.

Vouchers for the monies requested for, were prepared in favour of George Michael Mukula being payment of funds for health advocacy conferences in Acholi Inn and Mt. Elgon Hotel for the First Lady, which Vouchers were brought to him for signature at Munyonyo by a Ministry of Health staffer Ronah Birungi.

Jim Muhwezi on February 18, 2005, instructed the Under Secretary of the Ministry of Health in writing, to pay all the funds signed for by Mukula, to Jim Muhwezi himself other than giving them to Mukula who had signed the vouchers. The said money was physically handed over to and verified by Jim Muhwezi. However, the conferences did not take place. Jim Muhwezi refunded the Shs 210,000,000/= to Ministry of Health nine months later.

The Chief Magistrate’s Court convicted Ms Alice Kaboyo on own plea of guilty and was sentenced to a fine in respect of other funds. Muhwezi and Dr Kamugisha were acquitted on a no case to answer. George Michael Mukula was convicted.

George Michael Mukula appealed the sentence and conviction to the Anti-Corruption Division of the High Court of Uganda which on March 13, 2013 acquitted George Michael Mukula of all the charges. The High Court ruled that the trial Chief Magistrate’s Court did not properly scrutinize and evaluate the evidence adduced at the trial, that George Michael Mukula had not stolen any money as he had been erroneously accused. Mukula was consistent in his defense. He said ‘I did not receive the money’ or ……‘I did not smell the money’. The Court held that George Michael Mukula as a Minister was certainly not a public officer or employee. No money was lost by the Government of Uganda.https://ulii.org/ug/judgment/high-court-anti-corruption-division/2013/6

The Inspectorate of Government (IGG)informed the Court of Appeal on June 1, 2016 that it was no longer interested in pursuing the appeal against the acquittal of George Michael Mukula and was thus withdrawing its intended appeal with immediate effect.

It is said that George Micheal Mukula was being persecuted for having expressed political ambitions to run for the presidential seat of Uganda in the general elections. https://observer.ug/viewpoint/guest-writers/23932-was-mukula-politically-persecuted

Personal life
He is married and the father of four children. He belongs to the National Resistance Movement political party.

References

1956 births
Living people
Nkumba University alumni
National Resistance Movement politicians
Members of the Parliament of Uganda
People from Eastern Region, Uganda
People from Soroti District
Ugandan aviators
Government ministers of Uganda
People from Teso sub-region
21st-century Ugandan politicians
Teso people
Ugandan flight instructors